In Greek mythology, the Ceryneian hind ( Kerynitis elaphos, Latin: Elaphus Cerynitis), was a creature that lived in Ceryneia, Greece and took the form of an enormous female deer, larger than a bull, with golden antlers like a stag, hooves of bronze or brass, and a "dappled hide", that "excelled in swiftness of foot", and snorted fire. To bring it back alive to  Eurystheus in Mycenae was the third labour of Heracles.

Other names and descriptions for it were: doe with the golden horns, golden-horned hind, Ceryneia hind, Cerynitian hind, beast with golden antlers,  Parrhasian hind, nimble hind of Maenalus and beast of Maenalus. Frazer says that the hind took its name from the river Cerynites, "which rises in Arcadia and flows through Achaia into the sea".

One tradition says that Artemis found a mighty herd of five Ceryneian hinds playing on the base of Parrhasian hill far away from the banks of the "black-pebbled Anaurus" where they always herded. Artemis was so impressed by the hinds that she yoked four of them to her golden chariot with golden bridles, but purposely let one escape to the Ceryneian hill to be a future labour for Heracles. Whilst in Ceryneia, the hind chased farmers from vineyards.

The Ceryneian hind was sacred to Artemis. "The hind is said to have borne the inscription 'Taygete dedicated [me] to Artemis'." Because of its sacredness, Heracles did not want to harm the hind and so hunted it for more than a year, from Oenoe to Hyperborea, to a mountain called Artemisius, (a range which divides Argolis from the plain of Mantinea) before finally capturing the hind near the river Ladon.

Euripides says Heracles slew the hind and brought it to Artemis for propitiation. Another tradition says he captured it with nets while it was sleeping or that he ran it down, while another says he shot and maimed it with an arrow just before it crossed the river Ladon. Once Heracles captured the hind, and only after explaining to Artemis and Apollo ("who would have wrested the hind from him") that he had only hurt the sacred hind out of necessity, was he allowed to take it alive to Eurystheus in Mycenae, thus completing his third labour.

Art

Stag or Hind or female deer
"Pindar says that in his quest of the hind with the golden horns Hercules had seen "the far-off land beyond the cold blast of Boreas. [Hyperborea]" Hence, as the reindeer is said to be the only species of deer of which the female has antlers, Sir William Ridgeway argues ingeniously that the hind with the golden horns was no other than the reindeer."

A doe bearing antlers was unknown in Greece, but the story of the hind is suggestive of reindeer, which, unlike other deer, can be harnessed and whose females bear antlers. The myth relates to the Hyperborea, which may have been the archaic origin of the myth itself, as Robert Graves thought.

Authoritative primary source translations say the creature was a:

 doe
 hind
 deer
 hart
 stag plus Pseudo-Hyginus, Fabulae 30, (trans. Grant)
 beast

Classical Literature Sources 
Chronological listing of classical literature sources for the Ceryneian Hind:

 Pindar, Olympian Odes III 28 ff. (trans. Sandys) (Greek lyric poetry C5th BC)
 Euripides, The Madness of Hercules 375 ff. (trans. Way) (Greek tragedy C5th BC)
 Callimachus, Hymn 3 to Artemis 98 ff. (trans. Mair) (Greek poetry C3rd BC)
 Diodorus of Sicily, Library of History 4. 12. 13 (trans. Oldfather) (Greek history C1st BC)
 Virgil, Aeneid 6. 801 ff (trans. Dewey) (Roman epic poetry C1st BC)
 Philippus of Thessalonica, The Twelve Labors of Hercules (The Greek Classics ed. Miller Vol 3 1909 p. 397) (Greek epigrams C1st AD)
 Seneca, Hercules Furens 222 ff. (trans. Miller) (Roman tragedy C1st AD)
 Seneca, Agamemnon 833 ff (trans. Miller) (Roman tragedy C1st AD)
 Seneca, Hercules Oetaeus 1237 ff (trans. Miller) (Roman tragedy C1st AD)
 Pseudo-Apollodorus, The Library 2. 5. 3-4 (trans. Frazer) (Greek mythography C2nd AD)
 Aelian, On the Characteristics of Animals 7. 39 (trans. Scholfield) (Greek natural history C2nd AD):
 Pseudo-Hyginus, Fabulae 30 (trans. Grant) (Roman mythography C2nd AD)
 Quintus Smyrnaeus, Fall of Troy 6. 223 ff. (trans. Way) (Greek epic poetry C4th AD)
 Nonnus, Dionysiaca 25. 223 ff (trans. Rouse) (Greek epic poetry C5th AD)
 Nonnos, Dionysiaca 25. 242 ff
 Tzetzes, Chiliades or Book of Histories 2. 265 ff (trans. Untila et al.) (Greco-Byzantine history C12 AD)
 Tzetzes, Chiliades or Book of Histories 2. 495 ff

See also
 Deer in mythology

References
Theoi Project  digital  library about Greek mythology

External links

Labours of Hercules
Greek legendary creatures
Mythological deer
Deeds of Artemis